The New South Wales Minister for Corrections is a minister of the Government of New South Wales who is commissioned with responsibility for the administration of correctional services, juvenile justice, and prisons in the state of New South Wales, Australia.

The current Minister for Corrections is Geoff Lee, since 21 December 2021. The minister administers the portfolio through the Stronger Communities cluster, in particular through the Department of Communities and Justice, a department of the Government of New South Wales, and additional agencies.

Ultimately the minister is responsible to Parliament of New South Wales.

List of ministers

Former ministerial titles

Counter Terrorism

Justice

Juvenile Justice

See also 

List of New South Wales government agencies
 Justice ministry
 Politics of New South Wales

Notes

References

Counter Terrorism and Corrections
Counterterrorism in Australia